Squibs is a 1921 British silent comedy film directed by George Pearson and starring Betty Balfour, Hugh E. Wright and Fred Groves. It was followed by three sequels starting with Squibs Wins the Calcutta Sweep and a 1935 remake.

Cast
 Betty Balfour – Squibs Hopkins
 Hugh E. Wright – Sam Hopkins
 Fred Groves – PC Charlie Lee
 Mary Brough – Mrs. Lee
 W. Cronin Wilson – Bully Dawson
 Annette Benson – Ivy Hopkins
 Ambrose Manning – Inspector Robert Lee
 Tom Morris – Gus Holly
 William Matthews – Peters

References

External links

1921 films
1920s English-language films
Films directed by George Pearson
1921 comedy films
British comedy films
British black-and-white films
British silent feature films
1920s British films
Silent comedy films